The FIL World Luge Championships 1999 took place in Königssee, Germany for a record fifth time. Königssee had hosted the event previously in 1969, 1970, 1974, and 1979. The team event was modified to one each for men's doubles, men's singles, and women's singles starting at these championships which reduced the number of competitors per team from six to four.

Men's singles

Women's singles

Men's doubles

Mixed team

Medal table

References
Men's doubles World Champions
Men's singles World Champions
Mixed teams World Champions
Women's singles World Champions

FIL World Luge Championships
1999 in luge
1996 in German sport
International luge competitions hosted by Germany